Oakdale is a neighborhood of Rock Hill that was annexed into the city in the early 1980s. Oakdale is located at latitude 34.88 and longitude -81.051. The elevation of the neighborhood is 640 feet.

See also
Ebenezer, South Carolina
Newport, South Carolina
Boyd Hill, South Carolina

References

Rock Hill, South Carolina
Neighborhoods in South Carolina